The  is a series of commercial vans produced by Honda between 1996 and 2010. It was only sold in the Japanese market. The first generation Partner, which was produced from March 1996 to March 2006, was based on the Orthia station wagon, while the second generation, which was produced from March 2006 until September 2010, was based on the Airwave station wagon.

Gallery 

Partner
Station wagons
Compact cars
Front-wheel-drive vehicles
All-wheel-drive vehicles
Cars introduced in 1996
2000s cars
2010s cars